John S. Douglas House, also known as Dolfi Funeral Home, is a historic home located at Uniontown, Fayette County, Pennsylvania. It was built in 1901, and is a large -story, brick dwelling with a two-story rear wing added in 1967.  The house is in the Richardsonian Romanesque style, with Chateauesque elements. It is five-bays wide and has a wraparound porch and porte cochere. The front facade features rounded arched windows with wide cut stone arches.  Also on the property is a contributing carriage house.

It was added to the National Register of Historic Places in 1994.

References

Houses on the National Register of Historic Places in Pennsylvania
Romanesque Revival architecture in Pennsylvania
Houses completed in 1901
Houses in Fayette County, Pennsylvania
Uniontown, Pennsylvania
National Register of Historic Places in Fayette County, Pennsylvania